Max Simpson (born 24 July 2004) is a rugby league footballer who plays as a  for the Leeds Rhinos in the Betfred Super League.

In 2022 he made professional debut for Leeds against the Castleford Tigers.

References

External links
Leeds Rhinos profile

2004 births
Living people
English rugby league players
Leeds Rhinos players
Rugby league centres
Rugby league players from Leeds